Petals: The Minnie Riperton Collection is a posthumous 2-disc set compilation album by American R&B and soul singer Minnie Riperton, released in 2001 and issued by Capitol Records. The compilation consists of songs from her albums released on Epic Records and Capitol Records. The collection includes her number-one pop hit "Lovin' You", the popular "Perfect Angel", "Inside My Love", "Adventures in Paradise" and "Memory Lane".

Also featured is Riperton's last released single "Here We Go" from the album Love Lives Forever, a live reprise of "Lovin' You" featuring George Benson and a cover of Joni Mitchell's "A Woman of Heart And Mind". The tracks "You Gave Me Soul" and "Lonely Girl" from her Chess Records days, which she recorded under the name Andrea Davis, songs from her Come to My Garden album, as well as her material as a member of Rotary Connection on "I Took a Ride", "Were Going Wrong", and a cover of "Respect" appear here.

Track listing

References

External links
Minnie Riperton – Petals: The Minnie Riperton Collection (CD) Album, discogs.com
Petals: The Minnie Riperton Collection, Amazon.com.

2001 compilation albums
Minnie Riperton compilation albums
Capitol Records compilation albums
Albums produced by Johnny Pate
Albums produced by Stevie Wonder
Albums produced by Stewart Levine
Compilation albums published posthumously